Gond-e Vila (also Romanized as Gond-e Vīlā; also known as Gonbad-e Vīlā) is a village in Oshnavieh-ye Shomali Rural District, in the Central District of Oshnavieh County, West Azerbaijan Province, Iran. At the 2006 census, its population was 681, in 150 families.

References 

Populated places in Oshnavieh County